Golden Axe Warrior is an action-adventure role-playing video game, developed and published by Sega. It was released on the Master System in 1991 as a spin-off of the Golden Axe video game series. The game follows a young warrior who tries to avenge the death of his parents by exploring ten labyrinths, collecting nine missing crystals and battling with the evil tyrant Death Adder. Players must cross a large world, fight enemies, seek mysterious labyrinths, fight bosses, and obtain the crystals that are guarded by many monsters. All the playable characters from the original Golden Axe make cameo appearances.

The game has drawn comparisons to NES titles The Legend of Zelda and Willow, as well as Master System titles Ys I: Ancient Ys Vanished and Lord of the Sword. Golden Axe Warrior  received a positive to mixed reception upon release. It received positive reviews from American, French and German magazines, but was criticized by British magazines for having little to do with the arcade original.

Plot
The evil giant, Death Adder, has invaded the countries of Firewood, Nendoria and Altorulia and killed the royal families. A young hero from Firewood sets out on a quest to destroy the giant. To counter Adder's evil magic he needs to find the nine crystals of the royal family from Firewood. These crystals warded off Death Adder until the king was betrayed by a minister who sold the crystals to Adder. Death Adder has hidden the crystals in nine labyrinths. On his quest the hero visits numerous villages and discovers numerous people hiding from Death Adder. He can learn the Thunder, Earth, Fire and Water magics. He learns that the princess of Firewood is still alive and that he is the son of the king of Altorulia. After finding all nine crystals the hero is able to enter the tenth and final labyrinth where he must find the mythical Golden Axe, the only weapon that can harm Death Adder, before facing the giant himself.

Gameplay
Players take control of the game's hero, who can be named at the start of a new quest. The game features a large overworld with over 200 unique screens and many enemies. Players must retrieve each of the game's nine crystals by locating hidden labyrinths. Each labyrinth is guarded by monsters and full of puzzles that must be solved in order to reach the boss and retrieve the crystal. Throughout the game, players collect various items and abilities that allow access to previously unreachable areas. The tenth labyrinth is only accessible after collecting the nine crystals. Players must then find the Golden Axe and use it to defeat Death Adder.

Weapons and armor can be upgraded and several magic abilities can be learned. Using magic requires the use of pots which are depleted after every use. The game's currency is horns collected from enemies; these horns can be spent in towns throughout the game. Hidden areas can be uncovered by chopping down trees with an axe or clearing rocks using Earth magic.

Development and release
The game is considered to be one of the system's rarest games. It is included as an unlockable game in Sonic's Ultimate Genesis Collection for the PlayStation 3 and Xbox 360.

Reception

Golden Axe Warrior received a positive to mixed reception upon release. American magazine GamePro scored it 5 out of 5, comparing it to NES titles Legend of Zelda and Willow, concluding that Golden Axe Warrior is "a great game". It also received positive reviews from French magazines Joystick and Player One, each scoring it 88%, and German magazine Video Games, which scored it 81%. However, it received mixed reviews from British magazines, which pointed out that the game was vastly different from the original Golden Axe, including one in Sega Pro, which rated Golden Axe Warrior a 67%; Computer and Video Games also pointed out the difference, calling it an "incredibly dull RPG." Reviewers in Mean Machines called it "boring" and "tedious", recommending Ys and Lord of the Sword instead.

IGN mentioned the game in its article "A History of Gaming's Most Shameless Rip-Offs", calling it a rip-off of The Legend of Zelda. They noted similarities in enemies and map designs, and called the soundtrack "eerily similar" to Zelda but without any of the personality.

See also
Ax Battler: A Legend of Golden Axe

References

External links

1991 video games
Fantasy video games
Master System games
Role-playing video games
Sega video games
Top-down video games
Golden Axe
Video games developed in Japan